David Axmark, born 28 May 1962 in Sweden, is one of the founders of MySQL AB and a developer of the free database server, MySQL. He has been involved with MySQL development from its beginning along with the fellow co-founder Michael Widenius. He studied at Uppsala University between 1980 and 1984 

David has been involved with free software since 1980 and has said he is committed to developing a successful business model using free open source software. During early 2010 David made a Series A financing for OrangeHRM, "The World's Most Popular Open Source Human Resource Management Software".
David is a director at OrangeHRM.

On 4 December 2012, David Axmark, together with the other MySQL founders, Michael "Monty" Widenius and Allan Larsson, announced the MariaDB Foundation.

References

External links
 From Visions to Reality - an interview with David Axmark
 http://www.24-7pressrelease.com/press-release/orangehrm-closes-on-series-a-financing-147085.php

Swedish computer programmers
Free software programmers
Living people
1962 births